Mercury Falling is the fifth studio album by Sting. It was released in 1996 on A&M Records and was produced by Sting alongside longtime producer Hugh Padgham. The album features many tracks which see elements of soul and country music integrated to a greater extent than on past releases. Supporting musicians on the album include frequent collaborators Dominic Miller on guitar, Kenny Kirkland on keyboards, Vinnie Colaiuta on drums, and Branford Marsalis on tenor and soprano saxophone.

Mercury Falling was a success, reaching the top 10 in 18 countries, but failed to match the success of its predecessors. None of its four singles—"Let Your Soul Be Your Pilot", "You Still Touch Me", "I Was Brought to My Senses", and "I'm So Happy I Can't Stop Crying"—were hits across all regions, although the former two did perform well in the UK and especially Canada, where both reached the top 10. The album has been certified Platinum in three different countries (US, UK and Canada) and Gold in nine others. In 1997, the album earned Sting two Grammy nominations—Best Pop Vocal Album and Best Male Pop Vocal Performance for "Let Your Soul Be Your Pilot".

Music and lyrics

Alongside being used as the album's title, the phrase "mercury falling" appears as the first and last lyrics heard on the album. The lyric was the first written for the album (for "The Hounds of Winter"), and Sting later felt the phrase evoked the mood of the record and its variety of styles: "there are so many styles on this record and it darts around from genre to genre and back again. It's a very mercurial record, and it seemed to be the right thing to call the record."

"I Hung My Head" is one of many songs on the album to be played in an odd time signature, in this case . Johnny Cash performed a cover of the song on American IV: The Man Comes Around, his final studio album released during his lifetime. "Let Your Soul Be Your Pilot" displays a significant soul influence; Sting has stated that the music of artists such as Otis Redding and Aretha Franklin heavily inspired the track. Expanding on this theme, the Memphis Horns were brought in to play on the track. The lyrics were inspired by a friend who was suffering from AIDS, and how such an event can affect someone's outlook on life. Sting described the song as "a song about death, or dealing with death in a way that offers some sort of hope. I actually think it's quite an uplifting song - the intent is for it to be uplifting."

"I Was Brought to My Senses" is a song about gaining a greater appreciation for nature.

The track "Twenty Five to Midnight" was excluded from the American and Canadian releases. It was included in the CD-Maxi Single of "You Still Touch Me", as the 4th track. "La Belle Dame Sans Regrets" is sung entirely in French; its title translates to "the beautiful lady with no regrets". The song was co-written with Sting's guitarist Dominic Miller. "Valparaiso" was used during the closing credits of the 1996 film White Squall.

Reception

Mercury Falling was released on 26 February 1996. It reached number four in Sting's native UK and number 5 in the US, becoming his fifth straight studio album to make the top 5 in both countries. The album also achieved top ten placements in 16 other countries in addition to the European Albums Chart (where it topped the chart).

"Let Your Soul Be Your Pilot" was released as the album's first single on 19 February 1996. It became a top 20 hit in the UK, peaking at number 15, but stalled at number 86 in the US. It did, however, reach number 3 on the Billboard Adult Alternative Airplay chart. The single was most successful in Canada, where it peaked at number 7. "You Still Touch Me", the album's second single, reached number 27 in the UK. In the US, it was more successful than its predecessor, peaking at number 60. The song matched the previous single's chart placement in Canada, giving Sting yet another number 7 hit. A remixed version of "I Was Brought to My Senses", done by Steve Lipson, served at the album's third single. It barely missed the top 30 in the UK and failed to chart in the US. "I'm So Happy I Can't Stop Crying" was the album's final single. Toby Keith released a cover of the song as a single from his album Dream Walkin', Sting guested on the track which gave him his only country hit.

Track listing

Note: "Twenty Five To Midnight" was excluded from the original American and Canadian pressings of the album.

B-sides

Personnel 
 Sting – vocals, bass, arrangements 
 Kenny Kirkland – keyboards
 Gerry Richardson – Hammond organ (3)
 Dominic Miller – guitars, arrangements (8)
 B. J. Cole – pedal steel guitar (6, 11)
 Vinnie Colaiuta – drums
 Andrew Love – saxophones (2, 3, 5, 7, 8)
 Branford Marsalis – tenor saxophone (3), soprano saxophone (4)
 Wayne Jackson – trumpet (2, 3, 5, 7, 8)
 Kathryn Tickell – fiddle (4), Northumbrian pipes (9)
 Lance Ellington – additional vocals (3, 4)
 Shirley Lewis – additional vocals (3, 4)
 Monica Reed Price – additional vocals (3, 4)
 Tony Walters – additional vocals (3, 4)
 East London Gospel Choir – choir (3, 4)
 Graeme Perkins – vocal session coordinator (3, 4)

Production
 Sting – producer
 Hugh Padgham – producer, engineer, mixing
 Simon Osborne – engineer
 Bob Ludwig – mastering
 Gateway Mastering (Portland, Maine) – mastering location 
 Danny Quatrochi – personal technical assistant 
 Jeri Heiden – art direction, design 
 William Claxton – photography 
 Fabrizio Ferri – photography
 Miles Copeland III – management 
 Kim Turner – management

Accolades

Grammy Awards

|-
|  style="width:35px; text-align:center;" rowspan="2"|1997 || Mercury Falling || Best Pop Vocal Album || 
|-
|"Let Your Soul Be Your Pilot" || Best Male Pop Vocal Performance|| 
|-

Charts

Weekly charts

Year-end charts

Certifications and sales

References

External links
 Stingoop.com Mercury Falling Release Details

Sting (musician) albums
1996 albums
Albums produced by Hugh Padgham
A&M Records albums
Country albums by English artists